Alexander Smirnov (born 1983 in Saint Petersburg) is a German bridge player.

Bridge accomplishments

Wins

 North American Bridge Championships (2)
 Jacoby Open Swiss Teams (1) 2014 
 Mitchell Board-a-Match Teams (1) 2013

Runners-up

 North American Bridge Championships (3)
 Jacoby Open Swiss Teams (1) 2013 
 Reisinger (2) 2009, 2010

Notes

External links
 
 

German contract bridge players
Living people
1983 births